The Late Corporation of the Church of Jesus Christ of Latter-Day Saints v. United States, 136 U.S. 1 (1890), was a Supreme Court case that upheld the Edmunds–Tucker Act on May 19, 1890. Among other things, the act disincorporated the Church of Jesus Christ of Latter-day Saints (LDS Church).

The LDS Church was represented by its chief counsel Franklin S. Richards and former congressman James Broadhead.

Decision
The ruling in Late Corporation would have directed federal escheat of substantially all the property of the legally disincorporated LDS Church, which was estimated at $3 million. Following the decision, the U.S. Attorney for The Utah Territory reported seizing only $381,812 in assets. Real property, including LDS temples, was never seized, although the ruling authorized it.  Within five months, the LDS Church officially discontinued the practice of plural marriage with the 1890 Manifesto. On October 25, 1893, a congressional resolution authorized the release of assets seized from the LDS Church because, "said church has discontinued the practice of polygamy and no longer encourages or gives countenance to any manner of practices in violation of law, or contrary to good morals or public policy."

Chief Justice Fuller's dissent asserted that though Congress has the power to criminalize polygamy, "it is not authorized under the cover of that power to seize and confiscate the property of persons, individuals, or corporations, without office found, because they may have been guilty of criminal practices."

See also 
1890 Manifesto
Edmunds Act (1882)
Edmunds-Tucker Act (1887)
History of civil marriage in the U.S.
List of United States Supreme Court cases, volume 136
Morrill Anti-Bigamy Act (1862)
Poland Act (1874)
Reynolds v. United States (1879)
Second Manifesto (1904)
Smoot Hearings (1903–1907)

References

Further reading

External links

 

1890 in United States case law
History of the Church of Jesus Christ of Latter-day Saints
Utah Territory
United States law and polygamy in Mormonism
The Church of Jesus Christ of Latter-day Saints in the United States
United States free exercise of religion case law
United States Supreme Court cases
1890 in Christianity
19th-century Mormonism
United States Supreme Court cases of the Fuller Court
Church and state law in the United States
Christianity and law in the 19th century
Mormonism-related controversies